Darren Davidson is a British and Australian journalist. He is the Editor-In-Chief of Storyful, a business unit owned and operated by News Corporation. Based at News Corp's New York headquarters, Davidson leads editorial and commercial activities for Storyful's news division.

Prior to Storyful, Davidson was the Media Editor for The Australian. Davidson became media editor of The Australian in November 2015  after joining The Australian in 2011.

Davidson was born in the United Kingdom. He holds a BA Hons in History. After University, Davidson undertook a journalist apprenticeship with the National Council for the Training of Journalists.

He began his career in London, writing for local newspapers, business-to-business magazines and national newspapers including The Daily Telegraph.

Davidson is married with one daughter and one son.

References

Living people
Australian newspaper editors
Year of birth missing (living people)